The lycée naval of Brest, created in 1966 as « collège naval », is one of France's six military high school under custody of the French ministry of Defense. This school is part of the Naval Instruction Center of Brest and has two missions: to help the families and to help the Navy's recruitment.

Lycée Naval
The lycée naval is divided in two parts separated for the teaching:
The «Lycée» at the first sense, high school, which groups the three French years of high school in two specialties of the general teaching: sciences and a section about social and economics. 
The preparatory classes to the great schools which principal aim is to prepare the students to the admission exams for the officers in the Navy, Army and Air Force. But also the preparatory class to superior studies which has a level superior to the A-Level but not as hard as the preparatory classes.

History

The environment
The Naval Instruction Center groups the Lycée Naval, but also the school of Maistrance (training the future Navy's sub-officers) and the seaman's school. This center is above the Naval base.

Admission's conditions

The recruitment for the first year of high school  is made by a written exam (maths, French and English/German). It's common for all military high schools apart for the Air Force's. For the two other years it's made upon results.
The recruitment for the preparatory classes is made upon results during the last year of High School.

References

French Navy
Military academies of France
Naval academies